Francesco Imberti (born 7 August 1912 in Barge; died 3 October 2008 in Cavour) was an Italian professional football player.

Honours
 Serie A champion: 1932/33.

1912 births
2008 deaths
Italian footballers
Serie A players
Torino F.C. players
Juventus F.C. players
Delfino Pescara 1936 players
S.S.D. Lucchese 1905 players
S.S.D. Sanremese Calcio players
Association football forwards
A.S.D. La Biellese players
People from Barge, Piedmont